Swish may refer to:

Games 
Swish, a basketball shot that goes through the basket without touching the rim or backboard
Swish, a form of table tennis that can be played both by people who are blind or vision impaired and by people who are sighted

Music 
Swish (band), an indie rock band established in 1996
Swish (hip hop producer), an American hip hop producer/rapper
Swish (album), an album by Joywave
SWISH, the former name of the Christian rock band Hawk Nelson
Swish, the second title for The Life of Pablo, a 2016 album by Kanye West
"Swish", a song by Kid Ink from the EP 7 Series
"Swish" (song), a 2018 song by Tyga

Software 
Swish (payment), a mobile phone payment system in Sweden
SWiSH Max, software used to create cross-platform presentations
SWISH-E, software  to index collections of documents

People
Bill Nicholson (baseball) of the Chicago Cubs (1914–1996)
Nick Swisher of the New York Yankees (born 1980)

Others 
Swish cymbal, an exotic ride cymbal used in big band and swing band
Swish, an alcoholic beverage obtained by filling an (empty) cask from a distillery with water to leech the remaining liquor out.
Swish, a brand of curtain track

Swish function, a mathematical activation function in data analysis
Swish (slang), effeminate behaviour and interests in gay male communities
Swish (Neuro-linguistic programming), a technique used to diminish unwanted habits

See also 
 Swish Swish, a song by American singer Katy Perry featuring American rapper Nicki Minaj
 Swisher (disambiguation)